The men's 50 metre butterfly competition of the swimming event at the 2015 Southeast Asian Games was held on 10 June at the OCBC Aquatic Centre in Kallang, Singapore.

Records

The following records were established during the competition:

Schedule
All times are Singapore Standard Time (UTC+08:00)

Results

Heats

The heats were held on 10 June.

Heat 1

Heat 1 was held on 10 June.

Heat 2

Heat 2 was held on 10 June.

Final

The final was held on 10 June.

References

External links
 

Men's 50 metre butterfly